Howard Buck may refer to:

Cub Buck (Howard Pierce Buck, 1892–1966), American football player
Howard Buck (poet), American poet and critic

See also
Frank Buck (animal collector) (Frank Howard Buck, 1884–1950), hunter and "collector of wild animals", also an actor and director
Buck (surname)